An edge data integration is an implementation of data integration technology undertaken in an ad hoc or tactical fashion. This is also sometimes referred to as point-to-point integration because it connects two types of data directly to serve a narrow purpose. Many edge integrations, and actually the vast majority of all data integration, involves hand-coded scripts. Some may take the form of Business Mashups (web application hybrids), Rich Internet applications, or other browser-based models that take advantage of Web 2.0 technologies to combine data in a Web browser.

Examples of edge data integration projects might be:

 extracting a list of customers from a host Sales Force Automation application and writing the results to an Excel spreadsheet
 creating a script-driven framework for managing RSS feeds
 combining data from a weather Web site, a shipping company's Web site, and a company's internal logistics database to track shipments and estimated arrival times of packages

It has been claimed that edge data integration do not typically require large budgets and centrally managed technologies, which is in contrast to a core data integration.

See also 
 core data integration
 Business Mashups
 Rich Internet application
 Web 2.0
 Yahoo! Pipes
 Microsoft Popfly
IBM Mashup Center

References

Data management
Data integration